Jennifer Kaye Holliday  (born 18 January 1964 in Melbourne) is a softball player from Australia, who won a bronze medal at the 1996 Summer Olympics. She is the fastest women's softball pitcher, pitching at 123 km/h.

External links
 Olympic info

1964 births
Living people
Australian softball players
Olympic softball players of Australia
Softball players at the 1996 Summer Olympics
Olympic bronze medalists for Australia
Sportswomen from Victoria (Australia)
Olympic medalists in softball
Sportspeople from Melbourne
Members of the Order of Australia
Medalists at the 1996 Summer Olympics